"" is the national anthem of Ecuador. The lyrics were written in 1865 by poet Juan León Mera, under request of the Ecuadorian Senate; the music was composed by Antonio Neumane. However, it was not officially adopted by the Congress until September 29, 1948.

The anthem consists of a chorus and six verses, of which only the second verse and the chorus (before and after the verse) are actually sung. The verses are marked by a strong anti-Spanish sentiment and narrate the failed 1809 uprising against Bonapartist Spain and the 1820–1822 Ecuadorian War of Independence.

History
From 1830 to 1832, José Joaquín de Olmedo wrote a national anthem (chorus and four verses) as an homage to the nascent Ecuadorian state.  This composition, suggested by General Juan José Flores, was not set to music and did not gain popularity. In 1833, a hymn titled "Canción Ecuatoriana", of six verses, was published in the Gaceta del Gobierno del Ecuador No. 125 of December 28. A composition date of 1830 was given, but most historians do not consider this definitive, because it was by an anonymous author. In 1838, a Canción Nacional (National Song), of a chorus and six verses, appeared included in the pamphlet Poesías by General Flores, which was published by the Government Press. In a later editions, there were changes to the third verse. Even so, for historians, it is the second Canción Nacional that is known.

In 1865, the Argentine musician Juan José Allende, in collaboration with the Ecuadorian Army, presented to the National Congress a musical project for the lyrics by José Joaquín de Olmedo, but it was not well received. In November of this year, at the express request of the president of the Senate, Nicolás Espinosa, the Ambateño poet Juan León Mera Martínez, who was then the secretary of the Senate, wrote and submitted the lyrics of the National Anthem.  These lyrics were then sent, with Congressional approval, to Guayaquil, so that Antonio Neumane would set them to music. This is the hymn that would later be officialized as the definitive national anthem.

On January 16, 1866, the complete version of the lyrics by Juan León Mera were published in the Quiteño weekly El Sud Americano. In 1870, the national anthem premiered in the Plaza Grande (Plaza de la Independencia facing the Palacio de Gobierno), performed by the 2nd Battalion and the Compañía Lírica de Pablo Ferreti, directed by Antonio Neumane. The music was in the key of C flat major. The current introduction of 16 measures was composed by Domingo Brescia and Enrique Marconi in 1901. Today, the hymn is performed in the key of E major from 2001 onward.

In 1913, the Guayaquileño writer and diplomat Víctor Manuel Rendón submitted a new hymn with lyrics adapted from the music of Antonio Neumane, but ultimately the Legislature rejected the proposal.

On September 29, 1948, the National Congress declared Juan León Mera's verses an official anthem.

Lyrics

As a full performance can last up to three minutes, in many instances only a sub-90 second rendition of the chorus is performed at public events like soccer games.

Official lyrics

Full lyrics

References

External links
 Ecuadorian national anthem

National anthems
Ecuadorian music
National symbols of Ecuador
South American anthems
National anthem compositions in E major
1870 songs